The Sanremo Music Festival 1976 was the 26th annual Sanremo Music Festival, held at the Sanremo Casino in Sanremo, province of Imperia between 19 and 21 February 1976. The final night was broadcast by Rai 1, while the first two nights were broadcast live only by radio. The show was presented by  Giancarlo Guardabassi.
 
Rules of this edition consisted a competition among five teams, each one consisting of six singers. The two "team leaders" of each team were not subject to a vote and were automatically admitted to the finals.

The winner of the Festival was Peppino di Capri with the song "Non lo faccio più".

Participants and results

References 

Sanremo Music Festival by year
1976 in Italian music
1976 music festivals